Pontresina railway station is a railway station in the municipality of Pontresina, in the Swiss canton of Graubünden. It is located at the junction of the Bernina and Samedan–Pontresina lines of the Rhaetian Railway.

The station has a large station building and seven through tracks, numbered 1 to 7, but only three of these are served by platforms. A side platform adjacent to the station building serves track 1, whilst an island platform, accessed by a pedestrian subway, serves tracks 3 and 4. Adjacent to the station is a seven track depot building, responsible for maintaining the snow clearance equipment used on the Bernina line.

Services
The following services stop at Pontresina:

 Regio:
 hourly service between St. Moritz and Tirano.

The line from Samedan is electrified using the Rhaetian Railway's standard 11 kV AC, but the Bernina line uses its own 1000 V DC electrification, which introduces some complications into the operation of the station. Tracks 1 and 2 are electrified at 11 kV AC and used by trains from Samedan terminating at Pontresina. Tracks 4 to 7 are electrified at 1000 V DC and used by trains operating between St Moritz and Tirano over the Bernina line. Track 3 has a switchable overhead line and can be used by trains on either line, as well as trains operating through between the two lines, such as Bernina Express trains between Chur and Tirano.

References

External links
 
 
 

Railway stations in Graubünden
Rhaetian Railway stations
Railway stations in Switzerland opened in 1908